Tallinna HK Stars were a professional Estonian ice hockey team. They won the 2006–07 Estonian Championship.

Roster
Goaltenders:
 Viktor Seliverstov 26.08.1990

Defencemen:
75  Roman Potsinok 10.02.1975 180/90
59  Dmitri Kalenda 10.03.1991 182/71
19  Kaupo Kaljuste 15.12.1981 189/86
07  Dmitri Suur 25.02.1975 180/96
55  Ilja Tsegotov 07.10.1986 185/90
02  Daniil Osipov 20.12.81 180/80

Forwards:
44  Edgar Baranin 03.04.1990 182/74
79  Maksim Ivanov 05.06.1979 175/72
31  Jussi Nieminen 20.03.1982 185/91
71  Aleksandr Kuznetsov 29.01.1985 176/95
24  Mihhail Kozlov 24.04.1975 180/81
77  Andrei Zorin 07.02.1974 175/83
17  Paul Sillandi 10.06.1983 185/80
83  Roman Razumovski 07.01.1983 180/70
41  Mikhail Merkulov 25.06.1975 170/67
21  Aleksandr Vinogradov 20.06.1970 175/85
69  Arkadi Zaitsev 01.03.1990 190/70
22  Kirill Postolaki 04.03.1990 185/85
29   Evgeny Nokhrin 31.10.76 180/77
28   Eduard Valiullin 28.11.1966 177/87
25   Igor Starkovsky 18.05.1965 180/86
96  Andrei Lukin 26.02.89 188/75

References

External links 
 Archive of website
 Estonian Ice Hockey Association

Ice hockey teams in Estonia
Sport in Tallinn